The Brava! Tour, also known as BRAVA!, was the fourth solo concert tour by  Mexican  singer Paulina Rubio. It was launched in support of her tenth studio album, Brava! (2011) and the reissue entitled Bravísima! (2012). The tour was officially announced in December 2011, initially with Mexico venues confirmed. The show is inspired by spiritual concepts as the Maya calendar, the early traditions of Hinduism chakra and 2012 phenomenon. It was visualized, designed, and produced by boutique production company Zixi.

Setlist
This set list represents the 28 April 2012 show in Monterrey, Mexico. It does not represent all dates throughout the tour.

 "Me Gustas Tanto" 
 "Lo Haré Por Ti"
 "Enamorada"
 "Ni Una Sola Palabra" 
 "Nada Puede Cambiarme"
 "My Friend, Mi Amigo"
 "Baila Casanova"
 "Algo Tienes"
 "Me Voy"
 "Hoy Me Toca A Mí"
 "Yo No Soy Esa Mujer"
 "Ni Rosas Ni Juguetes"
 "Que Estuvieras Aquí"
 "Todo Mi Amor"
 "El Último Adiós"
 "Volvamos A Empezar"
 "Causa Y Efecto"
 "Sabes Que Te Amo" 
 "Amor De Mujer"
 "Don't Say Goodbye"
 "Boys Will Be Boys"
 "Acelerar"
 "Nada Fue Un Error"
 "Mío"

Encore
 "Te Quise Tanto" 
 "Y Yo Sigo Aquí"

Tour dates

References

2012 concert tours